Sachini Nisansala Lakshitha (born 11 November 2001) is a Sri Lankan cricketer. She plays as a slow left-arm orthodox bowler and a left-handed batter.

Career
In October 2021, she was named in Sri Lanka's squad ahead of the 2021 Women's Cricket World Cup Qualifier but did not get to play a match before the tournament abruptly ended due to the COVID-19 pandemic. She made her Women's Twenty20 International debut at the age of 20, in the 2022 Commonwealth Games Cricket Qualifier against Scotland on 18 January 2022. She took two wickets and enacted a run-out in that match. The captain Chamari Athapaththu won the Player of the Match award, however she handed it to the debutant Nisansala. Nisansala took one further wicket in her remaining three matches of that tournament.

She plays domestic cricket for Seenigama Women and Kandy District Women. She was the fourth highest wicket taker in the 2021–22 Sri Lanka Women's Division One Tournament, with 16 wickets at an average of 10.44. In May 2022, she was named in the ODI and T20I squads for the series against Pakistan. She made her Women's One Day International debut in the second match of the series on 3 June 2022.

References

2001 births
Living people
Cricketers from Galle
Sri Lanka women One Day International cricketers
Sri Lanka women Twenty20 International cricketers
South Asian Games silver medalists for Sri Lanka
South Asian Games medalists in cricket